Center City Tower was the working name of a formerly proposed skyscraper in downtown Philadelphia.

Designed and proposed by the firm now known as KlingStubbins (designers of Philadelphia's Penn Center and Bell Atlantic Tower), the building would have risen to a height of 1,050 feet (320 m) and 75 stories, making it the tallest building in The United States outside New York and Chicago, surpassing the height of the Bank of America Plaza in Atlanta.

The building was designed with an oblate footprint and several setbacks to the top culminating in a spire. Renderings depict it being sheathed in blue glass with studios/media center on the ground level.

History
The plot this building was designed to occupy was made available after the One Meridian Plaza fire on February 23, 1991 which left the building uninhabitable. The relative lack of a need for that much office space in Philadelphia ultimately doomed the proposal. In addition, two new highrises - Residences at the Ritz and 1441 Chestnut have occupied and bifurcated the original plot.

A long-lived rumor held that the building was being designed with Comcast Corporation, Philadelphia's most high-profile corporation, in mind. Such a rumor would have been killed on January 5, 2005, the day Comcast Center was officially launched.

See also

 List of tallest buildings in Philadelphia

References
Emporis - Center City Tower (Philadelphia)
KlingStubbins - Center City Tower

Unbuilt buildings and structures in the United States
Proposed skyscrapers in the United States